Varun is an Indian male given name. Notable people with the name include:

People
 Varun Aaron (born 1989), Indian cricketer
 Varun Agarwal (born 1987), Indian entrepreneur
 Varun Badola (born 1974), Indian actor
 Varun Singh Bhati (born 1995), Indian para high jumper
 Varun Chopra (born 1987), English cricketer
 Varun Dhawan (born 1987), Indian actor
 Varun Gandhi (born 1980), Indian politician
 Varun Grover (information scientist) (born 1959), American computer scientist 
 Varun Grover (writer) (born 1980), Indian comedian, screenwriter and lyricist
 Varun Kapoor, Indian actor
 Varun Khandelwal, Indian actor
 Varun Khanna (born 1984), Indian cricketer
 Varun Kumar (cricketer) (born 1980), Indian cricketer
 Varun Kumar (field hockey) (born 1995), Indian hockey player
 Varun Parandhaman (born 1991), Indian musician and songwriter 
 Varun Ram (born 1992), American basketball player 
 Varun Sahni (born 1956), Indian physicist 
 Varun Sandesh (born 1989), Indian-American actor
 Varun Sharma (born 1990), Indian film actor
 Varun Sharma (cricketer) (born 1987), Indian cricketer
 Varun Sharma (actor) (born 1990), Indian actor
 Varun Shrivastava, Indian social activist
 Varun Sivaram, American engineer 
 Varun Sood (born 1990), Indian cricketer 
 Varun Tej, Indian actor
 Varun Toorkey (born 1990), Indian television actor and model
 Varun Unni (born 1989), Indian film composer and singer

Places
 Varun, Iran (disambiguation)

See also
 Varuna (disambiguation)